Erastus Snow (November 9, 1818 – May 27, 1888) was a member of the Quorum of the Twelve Apostles of the Church of Jesus Christ of Latter-day Saints (LDS Church) from 1849 until his death. Snow was also a leading figure in Mormon colonization of Arizona, Colorado, and New Mexico.

Snow was born on November 9, 1818, in St. Johnsbury, Vermont, to Levi Snow and Lucina Streeter. He joined the institutional predecessor of the LDS Church, the Church of Christ, in the early 1830s. One of the missionaries who taught him was Orson Pratt. Snow's brothers, William and Zerubbabel Snow, joined the church prior to his joining. He was baptized on February 3, 1833, in Vermont. Snow moved to Kirtland, Ohio, where the church was headquartered, and was able to witness the dedication of the Kirtland Temple. However, he spent much of his time on missions, primarily in Pennsylvania. He later served a mission to Salem, Massachusetts, where he baptized several converts, including Nathaniel Ashby, a man with whom he shared a duplex when they both resided in Nauvoo, Illinois. Snow was ordained a member of the Seventy in 1836.

In April 1839, at the age of 20, Snow successfully petitioned the jailers at Liberty Jail to move Joseph Smith (founder of the Latter Day Saint movement) and the prisoners accompanying him to a different location. He was subsequently appointed a member of the high council of the church. In 1845, Snow received his endowment in the Nauvoo Temple. Over the course of his life, Snow served a total of sixteen missions to New England, St. Louis, Arizona, southern Utah, Denmark, Scandinavia, and Mexico. Writer George M. McCune has said of Snow: "He prevailed in debates over the Book of Mormon and healed and converted many during his life."

Snow was in the first Mormon pioneer company to journey to the Salt Lake Valley. He and Orson Pratt were the first two Mormons to enter the Valley, completing the journey on July 21, 1847. In October 1848, Snow began serving in the presidency of the Salt Lake Stake.

On February 12, 1849, Snow was ordained a member of the Quorum of the Twelve Apostles. On the same day, Charles C. Rich, Lorenzo Snow, and Franklin D. Richards were ordained. Snow served in this capacity until his death in 1888.

At the October 1849 general conference, Snow was assigned to lead a mission to Scandinavia. He had as a companion a Danish convert, Peter O. Hansen, who had joined the church in Boston. They focused most of their efforts in Denmark, but another convert had joined them, John E. Forsgren, who preached in Sweden.

While serving as a missionary in Denmark, Snow baptized the first Icelanders to join the church, ordained them to the priesthood, and sent them to Iceland to preach. Before the end of his mission, Snow began the publication of a church periodical in Danish.

Later in the 1850s, Snow served as the presiding church authority in the midwestern United States, using St. Louis, Missouri as his headquarters. While in Missouri, Snow edited the periodical St. Louis Luminary. He returned to the Utah Territory in 1857 and engaged in farming.

In 1860, Snow went with Orson Pratt on a mission to the Eastern states. By the time they reached the Eastern United States, Abraham Lincoln had been elected president. With the impending war, they were able to convince many church members to move to Utah Territory. Much of this migration happened in 1861 after the American Civil War had begun.

After returning to Utah in 1861, Snow was made the apostle in charge of the southern Utah Mormon settlements. He lived in St. George.

Personal life and death
Erastus Snow had four wives, 23 sons, and 13 daughters. One of Snow's daughters, Elizabeth, became the wife of Anthony W. Ivins and the mother of Antoine R. Ivins.

Snow died on May 27, 1888, in Salt Lake City, Utah Territory, at age 69.

Legacy
 Snow Canyon State Park (near St. George, Utah)

 Snow College (in Ephraim, Utah) 

 Snowflake, Arizona

See also
Hurricane, Utah

References

External links

"Snow, Erastus" in the Utah History Encyclopedia
Erastus Fairbanks Snow papers, L. Tom Perry Special Collections
Erastus Fairbanks Snow agreements, L. Tom Perry Special Collections
History of Erastus Snow, L. Tom Perry Special Collections
Printer's galley proofs of "Erastus Snow," L. Tom Perry Special Collections
Photographs of the First Presidency and Quorum of the Twelve Apostles under President John Taylor, L. Tom Perry Special Collections
Erastus Fairbanks and Artemisia Beman Snow family temple records, L. Tom Perry Special Collections

1818 births
1888 deaths
19th-century Mormon missionaries
American Mormon missionaries in Denmark
American Mormon missionaries in Mexico
American Mormon missionaries in the United States
American general authorities (LDS Church)
Apostles (LDS Church)
Burials at Salt Lake City Cemetery
Converts to Mormonism
Doctrine and Covenants people
Editors of Latter Day Saint publications
Latter Day Saints from Illinois
Latter Day Saints from Missouri
Latter Day Saints from Ohio
Latter Day Saints from Utah
Latter Day Saints from Vermont
Mormon pioneers
Harold B. Lee Library-related 19th century articles